Enrique Moreno Bellver (6 September 1963 – 8 February 2012) was a Spanish professional footballer who played as a central defender.

Career
Born in Valencia, Moreno played for Valencia, Rayo Vallecano and Valladolid.

Death
Moreno died on 8 February 2012, at the age of 48.

References

1963 births
2012 deaths
Spanish footballers
Footballers from Valencia (city)
Association football defenders
Spain youth international footballers
La Liga players
Segunda División players
Tercera División players
Valencia CF Mestalla footballers
Valencia CF players
Rayo Vallecano players
Real Valladolid players